Lambula contigua is a moth of the family Erebidae. It was described by socialite and zoologist Walter Rothschild in 1916. It is found on the Dampier Archipelago.

References

 Natural History Museum Lepidoptera generic names catalog

Lithosiina
Moths described in 1916